Cambarus pecki (formerly Procambarus pecki), sometimes called the phantom cave crayfish, is a species of crayfish in the family Cambaridae. It is endemic to Alabama where it is found in three unconnected caves in the Tennessee River drainage in Colbert County, Lauderdale County, and Morgan County.

References

External links
 

Cambaridae
Cave crayfish
Crustaceans of the United States
Endemic fauna of Alabama
Freshwater crustaceans of North America
Endangered fauna of the United States
Taxonomy articles created by Polbot
Crustaceans described in 1967
Taxa named by Horton H. Hobbs Jr.